Remo Senn (born 26 September 1976) is a retired Swiss football midfielder.

References

1976 births
Living people
Swiss men's footballers
FC Aarau players
FC Locarno players
FC Baden players
Association football midfielders
Swiss Super League players